Alfred Jackson "Jay" Powell Jr. (November 18, 1952 – November 26, 2019) was an American politician. He was a Republican member of the Georgia House of Representatives from the 171st District, serving from 2008 until his death in 2019.

Biography
Powell was born in Quitman, Georgia to Alfred Jackson "A.J." Powell Sr. and Mary Simpson and graduated from Brooks County High School. He received his bachelor's degree in politician science from Florida State University and his J.D. degree from University of Georgia School of Law. Powell was admitted to the Georgia State Bar and practiced law in Camilla, Georgia. He served as mayor of Camilla from 1996 to 2007.

Powell died on November 26, 2019, after collapsing at a lawmaker retreat in Young Harris, Georgia.

References

1952 births
2019 deaths
People from Camilla, Georgia
People from Quitman, Georgia
University of Florida alumni
University of Georgia School of Law alumni
21st-century American politicians
Georgia (U.S. state) lawyers
Mayors of places in Georgia (U.S. state)
Republican Party members of the Georgia House of Representatives
20th-century American lawyers